= Volleyball European Championship =

Volleyball European Championship may refer to

- Men's European Volleyball Championship
- Women's European Volleyball Championship
